Raimundas Karoblis (born 14 April 1968) is a Lithuanian politician. He served as Minister of Defence in the Skvernelis Cabinet led by Saulius Skvernelis from 13 December 2016 to 11 December 2020.

References 

Living people
1968 births
Place of birth missing (living people)
21st-century Lithuanian politicians
Ministers of Defence of Lithuania
People from Pasvalys District Municipality